Krachia cylindrata is a species of sea snail, a gastropod in the family Cerithiopsidae, which is known from European waters. It was described by Jeffreys, in 1885.

Distribution
This species occurs in the Mediterranean Sea, found off the Lipari Islands, Italy.

Description
The size of the shell varies between 2.5 mm and 5 mm.

References

 Jeffreys J. G., 1878-1885: On the mollusca procured during the H. M. S. "Lightning" and "Porcupine" expedition; Proceedings of the Zoological Society of London Part 1 (1878): 393-416 pl. 22-23. Part 2 (1879): 553-588 pl. 45-46 [ottobre 1879]. Part 3 (1881): 693-724 pl. 61. Part 4 (1881): 922-952 pl. 70-71 [1882]. Part 5 (1882): 656-687 pl. 49-50 [1883]. Part 6 (1883): 88-115 pl. 19-20. Part 7 (1884): 111-149 pl. 9-10. Part 8 (1884): 341-372 pl. 26-28. Part 9 (1885): 27-63 pl. 4-6 
 Hallgass A., 1985: Considerazioni sulle forme mediterranee di Cerithiopsis tiara e C. urioi n. sp; Notiziario del C.I.S.MA. 6 (1-2): 9-14
 Bouchet P. & Warén A. (1993). Revision of the Northeast Atlantic bathyal and abyssal Mesogastropoda. Bollettino Malacologico supplemento 3: 579-840

Cerithiopsidae
Gastropods described in 1885